Hong Kong Avenue of Comic Stars is an area of Kowloon Park in Hong Kong which has statues of characters from Hong Kong comics ranging from the 1960s to the 2010s, named after Avenue of Stars, Hong Kong. The section, built for HK$1.5-2 million to HK$2 million, opened in 2012. It was organized by the Hong Kong Comics and Animation Federation and the Hong Kong Productivity Council.

References

External links

 Hong Kong Avenue of Comic Stars
 Hong Kong Avenue of Comic Stars 
 Hong Kong Avenue of Comic Stars 

2012 in comics
2012 sculptures
Comics characters in other media
Hong Kong comics
Tsim Sha Tsui
Works based on manhua